The USC Trojans college football team represents the University of Southern California (USC) in the Pacific 12 Conference (Pac-12). The Trojans compete as part of the NCAA Division I Football Bowl Subdivision. The program has had 26 head coaches and three interim head coaches since it began play during the 1888 season. Since November 2022, Kenny Dillingham has served as head coach at Arizona State.

Key

Coaches

Notes

References

USC

USC Trojans football